Panellinios B.C. or Panellinios Basket, is a professional basketball club that is located in Athens, Greece. The club was founded in 1929.

The name Panellinios can be translated as Pan-Hellenic in English, and can be interpreted to mean "The Greek Nation". B.C. stands for basketball club. So the club's name can be interpreted to mean "The National Basketball Club". The Greek multi-sports club Panathinaikos A.O. was founded by Panellinios G.S. athletes. The club was previously owned by the Greek businessman Minos Kyriakou.

History
The parent athletic club, Panellinios Gymnastikos Syllogos, was founded in Athens in 1891, making it one of the oldest sports clubs in Europe. It had a team of gymnasts compete at the 1896 Summer Olympics in Athens. The team's leader was Sotirios Athanasopoulos. Members included Nikolaos Andriakopoulos, Petros Persakis, Thomas Xenakis, and 29 others. The team placed second out of the three teams in the parallel bars team event, earning a silver medal (retroactively awarded by the International Olympic Committee, as the awards at the first Olympic Games differed from the gold, silver, bronze format used later).

The Greek multi-sport club Panathinaikos was founded by Giorgos Kalafatis in 1908, when he and 40 other athletes decided to break away from Panellinios Gymnastikos Syllogos, following the club's decision to discontinue its football team. In 1929, the athletic association's basketball department, Panellinios B.C. Athens was founded, and that same year the club won the Athens basketball championship.

The "Golden Five" era
Panellinios has been the top-tier level Greek League's champion 6 times, in the years 1929, 1939, 1940, 1953, 1955, and 1957. In the club's early years, it featured the player Missas Pantazopoulos. The club would have likely won several more Greek championships during the 1940s, but could not because the league was temporarily disbanded because of World War II. In the early 1950s era, the team was called "The Golden Five" ("Chrysi Pentada" in Greek), or "The Fabulous Five". "The Golden Five" consisted of Themis Cholevas (PG), Dinos Papadimas (SG), Mimis Stefanidis (SF), Panos Manias (PF), and Aristeidis Roubanis (C). "The Golden Five" dominated not only Greek club basketball, but European club basketball in general. The Panellinios team also headlined the Greek 1952 Summer Olympics basketball team. Although the EuroLeague, then known as the FIBA European Champions Cup, was not formed until the 1958 season, it is widely believed that had it been formed earlier, that Panellinios would have won several EuroLeague championships, as many considered Panellinios to be the best club team in Europe during the early-to-mid 1950s. In that era, the head coach of the team was Nikos Nissiotis.

During that era, Panellinios took part in the biggest international club tournaments in Europe, the predecessor tournaments of the EuroLeague, that were then held instead of the EuroLeague tournament. The club advanced to the final of the 1954 San Remo Tournament, which they lost 81–74 to the Italian League club Olimpia Milano. Panellinios then won the 1955 Brussels Tournament, by defeating the Yugoslav League club Red Star Belgrade in the final, by a score of 91–67. Panellinios also won the 1956 San Remo Tournament, by defeating the Italian League club Virtus Bologna, by a score of 67–37.

In the inaugural 1958 season, the European 1st-tier level European Champions Cup (now known as the EuroLeague) was formed. By that time, the team was coming to the end of The Golden Five era, as only 2 players of The Golden Five remained on the team. The club was eliminated from the competition, after losing its series against Steaua SA Bucarest 2 games to 0, by scores of 63–60 and 75–72. During that era, the team also featured the great scorer Antonis Christeas and Georgios Moschos.

After the "Golden Five" era
The team stayed in the top Greek basketball division for 23 straight years, starting in 1963, when the league was re-formed into a new format. The club finished third in the top Greek League in both 1970 and 1978. During this era, it was the legendary Greek player Vassilis Goumas, that was the leader of the team. In the 1970–71 season, Panellinios player Paraskevas Tsantalis, scored 73 points in a Greek Basket league game against Panionios.

The club also finished as the runner-up in the Greek Cup in 1987. Panellinios also participated in the European 2nd-tier level FIBA European Cup Winners' Cup (Saporta Cup), and in the European 3rd-tier level FIBA Korać Cup competition, several times during the 1970s and 1980s.

Rise and return to First Greek Division
The club struggled in the 1990s, and was mired in the third and fourth divisions of the Greek lower leagues. New management came to the organization in 1999, when Minos Kyriakou took over the club, and the club would eventually again begin to establish itself as a strong presence in Greek basketball. In 2004, Panellinios returned to the top-level Greek League, after earning a league promotion, led by Marijan Kraljević and the Soulis brothers.

In 2006, the team advanced to the playoff round of the Greek League, led by Dimitrios Tsaldaris, Damir Mulaomerović and Ruben Boumtje-Boumtje, and finished 6th in the league, after losing in the playoffs to Aris. In 2007, the club finished in 5th place in the league, with players such as Mamadou N'Diaye, Michalis Pelekanos, Gary Trent, and Anthony Goldwire. The team lost to Panionios in the playoffs, but in finishing 5th in the Greek League, qualified for the new European 2nd-tier level EuroCup competition, for the first time in club history.

In 2010, the club moved from Athens, where it had been based for 81 years, to the city of Lamia. In March 2010, Minos Kyriakou, withdrew from the club's ownership position. In 2011, the club moved back to Athens.

Relegation and recent years
In the 2011–12 season, the Greek Professional Sports Committee stripped Panellinios of its professional licence, because the club faced economic problems. In addition, the club wasn't accepted by the lower tiers of the Greek basketball league system, and thus didn't play in any league during that season. The next season (2012–13), Panellinios played in the A ESKA Category (the First Athenian Regional Division). But the team's presence in the league wasn't successful. It finished in last place, and was relegated to the B ESKA Category.

In Europe

Arenas

The club plays its Greek League home games at Panellinios Indoor Hall, a small arena with a capacity of 1,800. and played its EuroCup home games at either the 4,000 capacity Indoor Hall Peristeriou, or at the Hellinikon Olympic Arena, which has a capacity of 15,000.

When the club moved to Lamia, its domestic Greek League and EuroCup home games were hosted at the Lamia Arena, which has a seating capacity of 5,000.

Honours and titles

European competitions
 European International Club Tournament
 Champions (2): 1955 Brussels Tournament, 1956 San Remo Tournament
 Runners-up (1): 1954 San Remo Tournament
EuroCup
 Final Four (1): 2009–10

Domestic competitions
Greek League
 Champions (6): 1928–29, 1938–39, 1939–40, 1952–53, 1954–55, 1956–57
 Runners-up (4): 1934–35, 1949–50, 1950–51, 1953–54
Greek Cup
 Runners-up (1): 1986–87
Greek League A2
 Champions (2): 1986–87, 2003–04
Greek League C
 Champions (1): 1998–99

Seasons
Scroll down to see more.

Notable players

Greece
  Georgios Apostolidis
  Nikos Argyropoulos
  Antonis Asimakopoulos
  Kostas Charalampidis
  Themis Cholevas
  Antonis Christeas
  Makis Dreliozis
  Ioannis Georgallis
  Andreas Glyniadakis
  Vassilis Goumas
  Dimitris Kalaitzidis
  Georgios Kalaitzis
  Sotiris Karapostolou
  Ioannis Karathanasis
  Kimon Kokorogiannis
  Markos Kolokas
  Dimitris Kompodietas
  Georgios Limniatis
  Albert Mallach
  Panos Manias
  Nikos Oikonomou
  Missas Pantazopoulos
  Dinos Papadimas
  Pantelis Papaioakeim
  Manos Papamakarios
  Nikos Pappas
  Michalis Pelekanos
  Alekos Petroulas
  Aristeidis Roubanis
  Vangelis Sakellariou
  Vangelis Sklavos
  Mimis Stefanidis
  Dimitris Tsaldaris
  Paraskevas Tsantalis
  Christos Tsekos
  Ian Vougioukas
  Vassilis Xanthopoulos
 - Anatoly Zourpenko

USA
  Mo Bailey
  Jeff Boschee
  Andre Brown
  Derrick Byars
  Josh Davis
  Anthony Goldwire
  Anthony Grundy
  Marcus Hatten
  Britton Johnsen
  Tre Kelley
  Joe Krabbenhoft
  Chris Owens
  Dylan Page
  Andrae Patterson
  Rick Rickert
  Ryan Robertson
  Melvin Sanders
  Mustafa Shakur
  Devin Smith
  Steven Smith
  Larry Stewart
  Jamel Thomas
  Gary Trent
  Jitim Young

Canada
  Juan Mendez

Europe
  Miroslav Berić
 - Roderick Blakney
  Aleksandar Ćapin
  Jurica Golemac
  Jan-Hendrik Jagla
  Marijan Kraljević
  Damir Mulaomerović
  Stevan Nađfeji
  Đuro Ostojić
 - Vladimir Petrović-Stergiou
  Ivan Radenović
  Damir Rančić
  Vlado Šćepanović
  Samo Udrih

Africa 
  Ruben Boumtje-Boumtje
  Mamadou N'Diaye

Oceania
  Brad Newley

Head coaches

References

External links
 Official Basketball Club Website 
 Official Athletic Association Website 
 EuroCup Club Scene
 Eurocupbasketball.com Team Page
 Panellinios BC – A Season For The Ages
 Eurobasket.com Team Page
 Galanis Sports Data

Panellinios
Basketball teams established in 1929
Basketball teams in Greece
Sports clubs in Athens